Victorious: Music from the Hit TV Show is the debut soundtrack for the Nickelodeon TV series Victorious. The majority of the album was sung by the lead actress of the television series, Victoria Justice, with the Victorious cast being listed beside her. Some of the other singers on the album include Ariana Grande, Elizabeth Gillies, Miranda Cosgrove, Leon Thomas III, Matt Bennett, Daniella Monet and Avan Jogia. The majority of the album was written by Michael Corcoran, Dan Schneider, Savan Kotecha, Kool Kojak and CJ Abraham with Victoria Justice involved in the composition of "Best Friend's Brother" and Leon Thomas III on "Song 2 You".

The album was released August 2, 2011 by Nickelodeon Records, in association with Columbia/Epic Label Group. All of the songs on this soundtrack appear on previously aired episodes of the first two seasons of Victorious. In the United States, the soundtrack debuted on the Billboard 200 albums chart at number five with 41,000 copies sold. It also peaked at number one on the Kid Albums and Soundtracks charts.

The lead single from the album, "Freak the Freak Out", was released on November 22, 2010, and was the soundtrack's most successful single released, peaking on the US Billboard Hot 100 songs chart at number 50. Other singles from the album include "Beggin' on Your Knees" (released April 1, 2011), "Best Friend's Brother" (released May 20, 2011) and "You're the Reason" (released December 3, 2011).

Music structure and lyrics
The album features the heavy usage of synthesizers, drum machine and Auto-Tune, prominent in songs like "Freak the Freak Out" and "Make It Shine". The lyrical themes involve light romance, happy and sad, and assertions of self-worth.

The mix of some tracks on the album are slightly altered in comparison to the versions heard in the show. The vocals of "Tell Me That You Love Me" are heard with a piano in the show, but the song has more instruments on the soundtrack. "Finally Falling" on this album removes Avan Jogia's opening verse. The show version of "All I Want Is Everything" has more prominent vocals from the other cast members. Full versions of the former two can be streamed at the show's student website, TheSlap.com.

Singles
The lead single "Freak the Freak Out" was released on November 22, 2010. The song was featured on the Victorious special, "Freak the Freak Out" and is the soundtrack’s most successful single released, peaking on the Billboard Hot 100 at number 50. The single was accompanied by a two-minute music video that premiered on Nickelodeon in mid-November. "Beggin' on Your Knees" was released as the second single and peaked at number 58 on the Billboard Hot 100. The song was accompanied by a music video directed by Marc Wagner, which was released on March 12, 2011. "Best Friend's Brother" was the third single released from the soundtrack on May 20, 2011. The music video for the single was released on May 28, 2011. It debuted on the Billboard Hot 100 at number 93 and peaked at number 86. "You're the Reason" was the fourth and final single released from the album, released on December 3, 2011.

Promotional singles

"Make It Shine" was released as the first promotional single on April 13, 2010. "Leave It All to Shine" was released June 10, 2011, as the second promotional single from the album and performed on the iCarly 90-minute special "iParty with Victorious" by the cast members of both iCarly and Victorious.

Track listing

Charts

Weekly charts

Year-end charts

Certifications

Release history

Victorious in Concert 

Victorious in Concert (officially Victorious Featuring Victoria Justice: In Concert) was a one night only concert held on May 26, 2011 at the Avalon Theater in Avalon, California. The concert was free, and was to promote the impending release of the soundtrack.

It was presented by Degree Girl, Dove, Suave, Walmart Soundcheck, and was advertised with contests in teen oriented magazines.

Walmart Soundcheck financed the event, and filmed the show to air on the Walmart Soundcheck website. Nickelodeon partnered with Walmart to release Victorious merchandise, and the concert aired on Walmart's in-store televisions during the back-to-school season.

The concert featured Victoria Justice, with Leon Thomas III, Elizabeth Gillies, Ariana Grande, Matt Bennett, Daniella Monet, and Avan Jogia.

Set list 
"Make It Shine"
"Freak the Freak Out"
"Song 2 You"
"Best Friend's Brother"
"I Want You Back"

References

2011 soundtrack albums
Columbia Records soundtracks
Television soundtracks
Victoria Justice albums
Victorious